
The Deputy Chief of Ordnance was in Sweden the head of the Swedish Army's ordnance establishments. During the 1800s and 1900s, his duties changed several times. The position was abolished in 1968.

History
The Master-General of the Ordnance was chief of the artillery. The matters, which he was to determine, were handle within two offices: the Generalfälttygmästareämbetets expedition ("Office of the Master-General of the Ordnance") and the Chefens för artilleriet expedition ("Office of the Chief of the Artillery"). In the first office, which was headed by the Deputy Chief of Ordnance, handled all matters related to materiel; in the latter, which was headed by the chief of the Artillery Staff, handled all matters related to the artillery personnel and the scientific training of the artillery branch. The Master-General of the Ordnance was also head of the Royal Swedish Army Materiel Administration's Artillery Department, and thus the Deputy Chief of Ordnance reported to him about all military matters as head of the Military Bureau (Militärbyrån). The Deputy Chief of Ordnance was also a military member of the mentioned department. The Deputy Chief of Ordnance later became the head of the Royal Swedish Army Materiel Administration's Artillery Department as well as the artillery factories and ordnance establishments. Even later, it was the name of the artillery officer (of the rank of regimental officer), who was the head of the Military Bureau of the Royal Swedish Army Materiel Administration's Artillery Department, who was responsible to provide arms and ammunition to the army.

Later in the 1900s, the Deputy Chief of Ordnance served in the Royal Swedish Army Ordnance Administration and was from 1 July 1957 deputy to the vice chief and from 1 July 1963 deputy to the chief of the authority. The Royal Swedish Army Ordnance Administration's Central Planning, Intelligence Center and Materiel Inspection were all three subordinate to the Deputy Chief of Ordnance. The Deputy Chief of Ordnance position was abolished in 1968 when the Royal Swedish Army Materiel Administration was disbanded.

Deputy Chiefs of Ordnance

See also
Master-General of the Ordnance

Footnotes

References

Notes

Print

Military appointments of Sweden